Alastair or Alasdair Morrison may refer to:

 Alastair Ardoch Morrison (1911–1998), Australian graphic artist and author
 Alasdair Morrison (politician) (born 1968), Scottish Labour Party politician
 Alasdair Morrison (banker)
 Alastair Morrison (British Army officer) (1924–2007)